is a Japanese actress and voice actress, who is affiliated with the Gekidan Subaru production company. She is married to Shigeru Ushiyama, a stage actor, voice actor and narrator also with Gekidan Subaru. Aizawa is originally from Kanagawa Prefecture.

Filmography

Anime

Television
 Boogiepop Phantom (2000), Kanae Oikawa
 Gensomaden Saiyuki (2000), Dr. Huang
 Detective Conan (2001), Hanaoka Reiko (ep 260)
 Last Exile (2003), Justina Valca (ep 15)
 Saiyuki Reload (2003), Dr. Huang
 Saiyuki Reload Gunlock (2004), Dr. Hwang
 Maria-sama ga Miteru: Haru (2004), Sayako Ogasawara (eps 1, 13)
 Sakura Taisen: Le Nouveau Paris (2004 OVA), Isabelle "Grand Mere" Lyotte
 Emma: A Victorian Romance (2005), Mrs. Campbell
 Emma: A Victorian Romance Second Act (2007), Mrs. Campbell

Films 
 Steamboy (2004), Ray's Mother
 The Girl Who Leapt Through Time (2006), Answering Machine Voice, Infirmary Teacher-in-charge

Original video animations 
 Sakura Taisen: Ecole de Paris (2003), Isabel "Grand Mere" Lilac
 Sakura Taisen: Le Nouveau Paris (2004), Isabel "Grand Mere" Lilac

Dubbing roles

TV series (regular appearance)
 The X-Files (1994), Dana Scully (Gillian Anderson)
 ER (1995), Diane Leeds (Lisa Zane)
 Stargate SG-1 (1997), Vala Mal Doran (Claudia Black)
 Third Watch (2000), Faith Yokas (Molly Price)
 Brothers & Sisters (2006), Sarah Walker (Rachel Griffiths)
 The Fall (2013), Stella Gibson (Gillian Anderson)
 The Good Doctor (2018), Dr. Audrey Lim (Christina Chang)

Films
 Tango & Cash (1990), Katherine 'Kiki' Tango, on TV broadcast version dub
 Demolition Man (1993), Lenina Huxley (Sandra Bullock)
 Heart and Souls (1993), Anne (Elisabeth Shue)
 Point of No Return (1993), Maggie Hayward (Bridget Fonda)
 Timecop (1995), Melissa Walker (Mia Sara)
 Village of the Damned (1995), Dr. Susan Verner (Kirstie Alley)
 Looking for Richard (1996), Lady Anne (Winona Ryder)
 Asteroid (1997), Dr. Lily McKee (Annabella Sciorra)
 Cliffhanger (1997), Jessie Deighan (Janine Turner)
 The Crow (1997), Shelly Webster (Sofia Shinas), on TV Tokyo dub
 Tomorrow Never Dies (1998), Paris Carver
 The X-Files (1998), Dana Scully (Gillian Anderson)
 The Man in the Iron Mask (1998), Christine Bellefort (Judith Godrèche)
 The Cell (2000), Dr. Catherine Deane (Jennifer Lopez)
 Man on the Moon (2000), Lynne Margulies (Courtney Love)
 X-Men (2000), Storm (Halle Berry)
 In the Mood for Love (2001), Su Li-zhen (Maggie Cheung)
 Hide and Seek (2005), Allison Callaway, on TV broadcast version dub
 Firewall (2006), Beth Stanfield (Virginia Madsen)
 La Vie en rose (2007), Titine (Emmanuelle Seigner)
 The X-Files: I Want to Believe (2008), Dana Scully (Gillian Anderson)
 Angels & Demons (2009), Dr. Vittoria Vetra (Ayelet Zurer)
 Last Light (2009), Hope Whitmore (Lynne Moody)
 Psycho (2010), Lila Crane (Vera Miles)
 The East (2013), Paige Williams (Julia Ormond)
 Saving Mr. Banks (2013), Aunt Ellie (Rachel Griffiths)
 Robot Overlords (2014), Kate (Gillian Anderson)
 Boychoir (2014), Ms. Steel (Debra Winger)

TV series (guest appearance)
Other TV series in which Aizawa dubbed for either sub-regular casts or guest include: Star Trek: Voyager, CSI: Miami (Season 2, episode 4)

References

External links
 
 

1963 births
Living people
Japanese stage actresses
Japanese video game actresses
Japanese voice actresses
Voice actresses from Kanagawa Prefecture